Mucoactive agents are a class of chemical agents that aid in the clearance of mucus or sputum from the upper and lower airways, including the lungs, bronchi, and trachea. Mucoactive drugs include expectorants, mucolytics, mucoregulators, and mucokinetics. These medications are used in the treatment of respiratory diseases that are complicated by the oversecretion or inspissation of mucus. These drugs can be further categorized by their mechanism of action.

Mechanism of action
Mucoactive agents - expectorants – include mucolytics, secretolytics and mucokinetics (also called secretomotorics) 
 Mucolytics – thin (reduce the viscosity of) mucus
 Secretolytics – increase airway water or the volume of airway secretions 
 Mucokinetics – increase mucociliary transport (clearance) and transportability of mucus by cough 
 Mucoregulators – suppress underlying mechanisms of mucus hypersecretion

Alternatively, attacking the affinity between secretions and the biological surfaces is another avenue, which is used by abhesives and surfactants.

Any of these effects could improve airway clearance during coughing.

In general, clearance ability is hampered by the bonding to surfaces (stickiness) and by the viscosity of mucous secretions in the lungs. In turn, the viscosity is dependent upon the concentration of mucoprotein in the secretions.

Mucolytics, secretolytics and secretomotorics are different types of medication, yet they are intended to promote drainage of mucus from the lungs.

An expectorant (from the Latin expectorare, to expel or banish) works by signaling the body to increase the amount or hydration of secretions, resulting in more, yet clearer, secretions and lubricating the irritated respiratory tract.
One mucoactive agent, guaifenesin, has anxiolytic and muscle-relaxing properties. It is commonly available in cough syrups and also as sustained-release tablets. 

Mucolytics can dissolve thick mucus and are usually used to help relieve respiratory difficulties. They do this by breaking down the chemical bonds between molecules in the mucus. This in turn can lower the viscosity by altering the mucin-containing components.

Mucoactive drugs
Many mucoactive drugs are available, including sodium citrate or potassium citrate, potassium iodide, guaifenesin, tolu balsam, vasaka, ammonium chloride, acetylcysteine, ambroxol, bromhexine, carbocisteine, erdosteine, mecysteine, and dornase alfa.

References

External links
 National Center for Biotechnology Information

Pulmonology